Quiet Dell School, also known as West Virginia Mountain Products, Inc. Cooperative, is a historic school building located at Quiet Dell, near Mount Clare, Harrison County, West Virginia.  The original section was built in 1922, with an addition completed in 1953.  It is a wood frame, drop sided building with a hipped and gable roof.  It was used as a school until 1970, after which it was occupied by Board of Education offices, a local kindergarten, and special needs classes until 1990. It was later occupied by the West Virginia Mountain Products, Inc. Cooperative.

It was listed on the National Register of Historic Places in 2001.

References

Defunct schools in West Virginia
Educational institutions disestablished in 1970
Former school buildings in the United States
National Register of Historic Places in Harrison County, West Virginia
School buildings completed in 1922
Schools in Harrison County, West Virginia
School buildings on the National Register of Historic Places in West Virginia
1922 establishments in West Virginia
1970 disestablishments in West Virginia